Mark Fields (born October 10, 1996) is an American football cornerback for the Birmingham Stallions of the United States Football League (USFL). He played college football at Clemson.

College career
Fields was a member of the Clemson Tigers football team for four seasons, including the 2016 and 2018 national championship squads. He served mostly as a reserve defensive back, tallying 45 tackles, 13 passes broken up and one interception, which he returned 42 yards for a touchdown, in 48 games played (six starts).

Professional career

Kansas City Chiefs
Fields signed with the Kansas City Chiefs as an undrafted free agent on April 27, 2019.

Minnesota Vikings
The Chiefs traded Fields to the Minnesota Vikings for a 2021 seventh-round draft pick on August 31, 2019. He made his NFL debut in the Vikings season opener on September 8, 2019. He was waived by the Vikings on September 14, 2019 and re-signed to the practice squad two days later. He signed a reserve/future contract with the Vikings on January 12, 2020.

Fields was waived by the Vikings during final roster cuts on September 5, 2020, and was signed to the practice squad the next day. He was elevated to the active roster on September 19 for the team's week 2 game against the Indianapolis Colts, and reverted to the practice squad after the game. He was elevated again on September 26 for the week 3 game against the Tennessee Titans, and reverted to the practice squad again following the game. On October 26, 2020, Fields was promoted to the active roster. He was placed on injured reserve on November 6, 2020, after suffering a punctured lung against the Green Bay Packers. He was activated from injured reserve on December 15, 2020, and waived by the Vikings the next day.

Houston Texans 
On December 17, 2020, Fields was claimed off waivers by the Houston Texans. He was waived after the season on March 2, 2021.

San Francisco 49ers
The San Francisco 49ers claimed Fields off waivers on March 3, 2021. Fields was waived by the 49ers on August 10, 2021.

Birmingham Stallions
Fields signed with the Birmingham Stallions of the United States Football League on August 22, 2022. He was transferred to the team's inactive list on March 19, 2023.

Personal life
Fields is the son of former Pro Bowl linebacker Mark Fields.

References

External links
Clemson Tigers bio
Minnesota Vikings bio

1996 births
Living people
People from Cornelius, North Carolina
Players of American football from North Carolina
American football cornerbacks
Clemson Tigers football players
Kansas City Chiefs players
Minnesota Vikings players
Houston Texans players
San Francisco 49ers players
Birmingham Stallions (2022) players